The Monument to Nizami Ganjavi, a medieval Persian poet, is located in Chaoyang Park, in Beijing, China. Yuan Xikun, a Chinese artist, is the author of the monument.

History

The monument was created by Yuan Xikun in reply to an invitation of Azerbaijan to celebrate the 20th anniversary of establishment of diplomatic relationships between the People’s Republic of China and Azerbaijan.

A solemn opening ceremony of the monument was held on December 6, 2012. Latif Gandilov, the ambassador of Azerbaijan to China, officials from Chinese Ministry of Foreign Affairs and Ministry of Culture, together with Yuan Xikun, the curator of Jintai Art Museum as well as the author of the monument, unveiled the monument.

Description of the monument
The monument consists of a granite bust of the poet portraying him with a turban on the head. The name of the poet, the dates of his birth and death and also “The great Azerbaijani poet, scientist and thinker” phrase are written on a pedestal in Chinese and Azerbaijani languages. There is also a sentence by the poet in Azerbaijani and Chinese languages:

Faking Nizami's nationality has been condemned by chairman of Iran’s Cultural Heritage Organization Mohammad Javad Adabi who stated that "falsification of the identity of great Iranian poet Nizami Ganjavi is evidence of the poorness of Azerbaijan’s culture".

See also 
 Campaign on granting Nizami the status of the national poet of Azerbaijan

References

External links
 В Пекине установлен памятник Низами Гянджеви
 В Пекине завершен памятник азербайджанскому поэту Низами Гянджеви

Buildings and structures completed in 2012
Monuments and memorials in China
Beijing